Torino Oval Lingotto is an indoor arena in Turin, Italy. It was built for use at the 2006 Winter Olympics, during which it hosted speed skating events. It has a capacity of 8,500 spectators and was designed by the global Sports Architects Populous with Studio Zoppini Associati of Milan 

After Olympic competition at the venue concluded on 25 February 2006, plans for the structure now include use for fairs and exhibitions in connection with the Lingotto exhibition centre. It will also be able to accommodate 2,000 spectators for ice skating events, however, the venue has remained iceless since 2007.

Events
The 2006 World Fencing Championships took place in the Oval Lingotto from 29 September to 7 October.

The Oval hosted the 2009 European Indoor Championships in Athletics, for which it had a seating capacity for 6,600 spectators.

See also
 List of indoor arenas in Italy
 List of indoor speed skating rinks

References

External links

Photos of Oval Lingotto
AUTOECO vehicle show

Indoor arenas in Italy
Speed skating venues in Italy
Olympic speed skating venues
Indoor speed skating venues
Venues of the 2006 Winter Olympics
Indoor track and field venues
Sports venues in Turin
Buildings and structures in Turin